

Canadian Pacific Air Lines Flight 301 was a scheduled passenger flight from Honolulu, Hawaii to Nadi, Fiji. On 22 July 1962, it was being operated by a Bristol Britannia 314 four-engine turboprop airliner of Canadian Pacific Air Lines, registered CF-CZB. On departure from Honolulu International Airport, the aircraft had engine problems; while attempting a subsequent return and landing on three engines, the crew initiated a go-around that resulted in the plane crashing on the airfield, killing 27 of the 40 on board.

Accident
Shortly after take-off from Honolulu, the crew received an engine fire warning for the number one engine, which they feathered. They then jettisoned fuel before returning to Honolulu 40 minutes later. Their three-engined approach appeared to be normal, but at the last minute the crew decided to go around and attempt another approach.

The aircraft then banked and veered to the left, and the left wing tip hit the ground about 550' from the center of the runway. The aircraft disintegrated as it moved across the airfield before hitting some heavy earth-moving equipment. Apart from the rear fuselage and tail, the aircraft was destroyed by fire. Thirteen on board escaped, but 7 crew and 20 passengers were killed.

Aircraft
The aircraft, a Bristol Britannia 314 four-engined turboprop, was built in the United Kingdom, and first flew on 14 April 1958. It was delivered new to Canadian Pacific Air Lines on 29 April 1958, and was originally named Empress of Vancouver (later renamed Empress of Lima).

Probable cause
The accident investigation board concluded the probable cause of the accident was "the attempted three-engine go-around, when the aircraft was in a full landing configuration, at insufficient airspeed and altitude to maintain control."

References
Citations

Bibliography

External links
 Investigation of Aircraft Accident: CANADIAN PACIFIC AIRWAYS: HONOLULU, HAWAII: 1962-07-22  (PDF link) - Civil Aeronautics Board

301
Accidents and incidents involving the Bristol Britannia
Aviation accidents and incidents in 1962
Airliner accidents and incidents in Hawaii
Oahu
1962 in Hawaii
July 1962 events in the United States